The South African type XM tender was a steam locomotive tender.

Ten Type XM tenders entered service in 1913, as tenders to the Class 4A  Mountain type steam locomotives which were acquired by the South African Railways in that year.

Manufacturer
Type XM tenders were built by the North British Locomotive Company in 1913.

The original Class 4 Mountain type locomotive was designed as a heavy mixed traffic locomotive by H.M. Beatty, the last Chief Locomotive Superintendent of the Cape Government Railways (CGR), at the Salt River shops. Soon after the South African Railways (SAR) locomotive renumbering project was implemented in 1912, an order was placed with North British for a further ten locomotives of this type. They were delivered late in 1913 and were designated Class 4A. The Type XM entered service as tenders to these engines.

Characteristics

Locomotive
In the SAR years, tenders were numbered for the engines they were delivered with. In most cases, an oval number plate, bearing the engine number and often also the tender type, would be attached to the rear end of the tender. Only the ten Class 4A locomotives were delivered new with Type XM tenders, numbered in the SAR number range from 1551 to 1560.

Classification letters
Since many tender types are interchangeable between different locomotive classes and types, a tender classification system was adopted by the SAR. The first letter of the tender type indicates the classes of engines to which it could be coupled. The "X_" tenders could be used with the locomotive classes as shown.
 CGR Mountain, SAR Class 4.
 SAR Class 4A.
 SAR Class 5.
 CGR 6th Class of 1897, SAR Class 6B.
 Oranje-Vrijstaat Gouwerment-Spoorwegen  6th Class L3, SAR Class 6E.
 CGR 6th Class of 1901 (Neilson, Reid), SAR Class 6H.
 CGR 6th Class of 1902, SAR Class 6J.
 CGR 8th Class of 1902, SAR Class 8.
 Imperial Military Railways 8th Class, SAR Class 8A.
 Central South African Railways Class 8-L2, SAR Class 8B.
 Central South African Railways Class 8-L3, SAR Class 8C.
 CGR 8th Class 4-8-0 of 1903, SAR Class 8D.
 CGR 8th Class Experimental, SAR Class 8E.
 CGR 8th Class 4-8-0 of 1904, SAR Class 8F.
 CGR 8th Class 2-8-0 of 1903, SAR Class 8Y.
 CGR 8th Class 2-8-0 of 1904, SAR Class 8Z.
 Central South African Railways Class 9, SAR Class 9.
 Central South African Railways Class 10, SAR Class 10.
 Central South African Railways Class 10-2 Saturated, SAR Class 10A.
 Central South African Railways Class 10-2 Superheated. SAR Class 10B.
 Central South African Railways Class 10-C, SAR Class 10C.
 Central South African Railways Class 11, SAR Class 11.
 CGR 9th Class of 1903, SAR Class Experimental 4.
 CGR 9th Class of 1906, SAR Class Experimental 5.
 CGR 10th Class, SAR Class Experimental 6.
 SAR Class ME.
 Central South African Railways Mallet Superheated, SAR Class MF.

The second letter indicates the tender's water capacity.

A number, when added after the letter code, usually indicates differences between similar tender types, such as function, wheelbase or coal bunker capacity.

Modification
Pictures of most of these locomotives in service show them with a modified tender with built-up sides to the coal bunker to increase the coal capacity. Early versions of the built-up coal bunker sides were in the form of a slatted open-top cage, made of rectangular steel rods. Later versions were constructed of sheet-metal.

Illustration

References

XM